Adanim Youth Village (Kfar No'ar Adanim) is a youth village in the northwestern Negev desert of southern Israel. Located close to Beit Kama, it is within the borders of Bnei Shimon Regional Council.

The youth village was established in 2007 and houses a boarding school catering for around 60 pupils age 12 to 18 with mental and emotional difficulties. It is under the jurisdiction of the Ministry of Welfare and Social Services.

External links
Official website

Youth villages in Israel
Populated places established in 2007
Populated places in Southern District (Israel)